Contention or contentious  may refer to:

 Resource contention, in computer science, a conflict over access to a shared resource
 Contention (telecommunications), a media access method to share a broadcast medium
 Bus contention, an undesirable state in computer design 
 Contention City, Arizona, U.S., a ghost town
 Contention, Oregon, U.S., later known as Twickenham
 FV4401 Contentious, a prototype British tank destroyer

See also

Argument
Controversy
Contention ratio, in computer networking
Contentious jurisdiction, in English ecclesiastical law
Contentious politics